Valerie Olukemi A "Kemi" Olusanya (13 October 1963 – 25 April 1999), commonly known by her stage name Kemistry,  was a leading English drum and bass DJ of the early 1990s, half of duo Kemistry & Storm, and co-founder of the Metalheadz record label.

Career
Born in Birmingham, Olusanya grew up in Kettering, Northamptonshire, and began a career as a make-up artist before giving it up for DJing in the early 1990s. She was half of the DJ and recording duo, Kemistry & Storm, which she formed with an old friend when they both lived in London. They both started out playing on pirate radio stations Touchdown and Defection FM. With Goldie, they formed the Metalheadz record label. After two-and-a-half years at the label, they moved on to concentrate on DJing and also released a widely distributed mix album, DJ-Kicks: Kemistry & Storm, which has been described as "paving the way for other, younger, female DJs".

Death
At 2:30 am on 25 April 1999, Olusanya was a front-seat passenger in a car travelling on the M3 motorway in Hampshire, behind a van which dislodged a cat's eye in the road. The steel body flew through the windscreen hitting Olusanya in the face. She was killed instantly. The coroner recorded a verdict of accidental death.

The track "Kemistry" by Goldie, originally released in 1992 when they were in a relationship together, and also featured on his 1995 album Timeless, is dedicated to her.

See also
 Metalheadz

References

External links

1963 births
1999 deaths
Club DJs
English electronic musicians
English drum and bass musicians
English women DJs
Black British DJs
Musicians from Birmingham, West Midlands
Road incident deaths in England
20th-century English musicians
English women in electronic music
English people of Nigerian descent
20th-century English women
20th-century English people
Electronic dance music DJs